The Centaur is a family of rocket propelled upper stages produced by U.S. launch service provider United Launch Alliance, with one main active version and one version under development. The  diameter Common Centaur/Centaur III flies as the upper stage of the Atlas V launch vehicle, and the  diameter Centaur V is being developed as the upper stage of ULA's new Vulcan rocket. Centaur was the first rocket stage to use liquid hydrogen (LH2) and liquid oxygen (LOX) propellants, a high-energy combination that is ideal for upper stages but has significant handling difficulties.

Characteristics
The thin walls minimize the mass of the tanks, maximizing the stage's overall performance.

A common bulkhead separates the LOX and LH2 tanks, further reducing the tank mass. It is made of two stainless steel skins separated by a fiberglass honeycomb. The fiberglass honeycomb minimizes heat transfer between the extremely cold LH2 and relatively warm LOX.

The main propulsion system consists of one or two Aerojet Rocketdyne RL10 engines. The stage is capable of up to twelve restarts, limited by propellant, orbital lifetime, and mission requirements. Combined with the insulation of the propellant tanks, this allows Centaur to perform the multi-hour coasts and multiple engine burns required on complex orbital insertions.

The reaction control system (RCS) also provides ullage and consists of twenty hydrazine monopropellant engines located around the stage in two 2-thruster pods and four 4-thruster pods. For propellant,  of Hydrazine is stored in a pair of bladder tanks and fed to the RCS engines with pressurized helium gas, which is also used to accomplish some main engine functions.

Current versions
As of 2019, all but two of the many Centaur variants had been retired: Common Centaur/Centaur III (active) and Centaur V (in development).

Current engines

Centaur III/Common Centaur
Common Centaur is the upper stage of the Atlas V rocket.  Earlier Common Centaurs were propelled by the RL10-A-4-2 version of the RL-10. Since 2014, Common Centaur has flown with the RL10-C-1 engine, which is shared with the Delta Cryogenic Second Stage, to reduce costs. The Dual Engine Centaur (DEC) configuration will continue to use the smaller RL10-A-4-2 to accommodate two engines in the available space.

The Atlas V can fly in multiple configurations, but only one affects the way Centaur integrates with the booster and fairing: the  diameter Atlas V payload fairing attaches to the booster and encapsulates the upper stage and payload, routing fairing-induced aerodynamic loads into the booster. If the  diameter payload fairing is used, the attachment point is at the top (forward end) of Centaur, routing loads through the Centaur tank structure.

The latest Common Centaurs can accommodate secondary payloads using an Aft Bulkhead Carrier attached to the engine end of the stage.

Single Engine Centaur (SEC) 
Most payloads launch on Single Engine Centaur (SEC) with one RL10. This is the variant for all normal flights of the Atlas V (indicated by the last digit of the naming system, for example Atlas V 421).

Dual Engine Centaur (DEC) 
A dual engine variant with two RL-10 engines is available, but only for launching the CST-100 Starliner crewed spacecraft and possibly the Dream Chaser ISS logistics spaceplane. The higher thrust of two engines allows a gentler ascent with more horizontal velocity and less vertical velocity, which reduces deceleration to survivable levels in the event of a launch abort and ballistic reentry occurring at any point in the flight.

Centaur V
Centaur V will be the upper stage of the new Vulcan launch vehicle currently being developed by the United Launch Alliance to meet the needs of the National Security Space Launch (NSSL) program. Vulcan was initially intended to enter service with an upgraded variant of the Common Centaur, with an upgrade to the Advanced Cryogenic Evolved Stage (ACES) planned after the first few years of flights.

In late 2017, ULA decided to bring elements of the ACES upper stage forward and begin work on Centaur V. Centaur V will have ACES'  diameter and advanced insulation, but does not include the Integrated Vehicle Fluids (IVF) feature expected to allow the extension of upper stage on-orbit life from hours to weeks. Centaur V will use two different versions of the RL10-C engine with nozzle extensions to improve the fuel consumption for the heaviest payloads. This increased capability over Common Centaur will permit ULA to meet NSSL requirements and retire both the Atlas V and Delta IV Heavy rocket families earlier than initially planned. The new rocket publicly became the Vulcan Centaur in March 2018. In May 2018, the Aerojet Rocketdyne RL10 was announced as Centaur V's engine following a competitive procurement process against the Blue Origin BE-3. Each stage will mount two engines. In September 2020, ULA announced that ACES was no longer being developed, and that Centaur V would be used instead. Tory Bruno, ULA's CEO, stated that the Vulcan's Centaur 5 will have 40% more endurance and two and a half times more energy than the upper stage ULA currently flies. “But that’s just the tip of the iceberg,” Bruno elaborated. “I’m going to be pushing up to 450, 500, 600 times the endurance over just the next handful of years. That will enable a whole new set of missions that you cannot even imagine doing today.”

History
The Centaur concept originated in 1956 when Convair began studying a liquid hydrogen fueled upper stage. The ensuing project began in 1958 as a joint venture among Convair, the Advanced Research Projects Agency (ARPA), and the U.S. Air Force. In 1959, NASA assumed ARPA's role. Centaur initially flew as the upper stage of the Atlas-Centaur launch vehicle, encountering a number of early developmental issues due to the pioneering nature of the effort and the use of liquid hydrogen. In 1994 General Dynamics sold their Space Systems division to Lockheed-Martin.

Centaur A-D (Atlas) 

The Centaur was originally developed for use with the Atlas launch vehicle family. Known in early planning as the 'high-energy upper stage', the choice of the mythological Centaur as a namesake was intended to represent the combination of the brute force of the Atlas booster and finesse of the upper stage.

Initial Atlas-Centaur launches used developmental versions, labeled Centaur-A through -C. The only Centaur-A launch on 8 May 1962 ended in an explosion 54 seconds after liftoff when insulation panels on the Centaur separated early, causing the LH2 tank to overheat and rupture. After extensive redesigns, the only Centaur-B flight on 26 November 1963 was successful. Centaur-C flew three times with two failures and one launch declared successful although the Centaur failed to restart. Centaur-D was the first version to enter operational service, with fifty-six launches.

On 30 May 1966, an Atlas-Centaur boosted the first Surveyor lander towards the Moon. This was followed by six more Surveyor launches over the next two years, with the Atlas-Centaur performing as expected. The Surveyor program demonstrated the feasibility of reigniting a hydrogen engine in space and provided information on the behavior of LH2 in space.

By the 1970s, Centaur was fully mature and had become the standard rocket stage for launching larger civilian payloads into high Earth orbit, also replacing the Atlas-Agena vehicle for NASA planetary probes.

By the end of 1989, Centaur-D and -G had been used as the upper stage for 63 Atlas rocket launches, 55 of which were successful.

Saturn I S-V 

The Saturn I was designed to fly with a S-V third stage to enable payloads to go beyond low earth orbit (LEO). The S-V stage was intended to be powered by two RL-10A-1 engines burning liquid hydrogen as fuel and liquid oxygen as oxidizer. The S-V stage was flown four times on missions SA-1 through SA-4, all four of these missions had the S-V's tanks filled with water to be used a ballast during launch. The stage was not flown in an active configuration.

Centaur D-1T (Titan III)

The Centaur D was improved for use on the far more powerful Titan III booster in the 1970s, with the first launch of the resulting Titan IIIE in 1974. The Titan IIIE more than tripled the payload capacity of Atlas-Centaur, and incorporated improved thermal insulation, allowing an orbital lifespan of up to five hours, an increase over the 30 minutes of the Atlas-Centaur.

The first launch of Titan IIIE in February 1974 was unsuccessful, with the loss of the Space Plasma High Voltage Experiment (SPHINX) and a mockup of the Viking probe. It was eventually determined that Centaur's engines had ingested an incorrectly installed clip from the oxygen tank.

The next Titan-Centaurs launched Helios 1, Viking 1, Viking 2, Helios 2, Voyager 1, and Voyager 2. The Titan booster used to launch Voyager 1 had a hardware problem that caused a premature shutdown, which the Centaur stage detected and successfully compensated for. Centaur ended its burn with less than 4 seconds of fuel remaining.

Centaur  (Atlas G)
Centaur was introduced on the Atlas G and was carried over to the very similar Atlas I.

Shuttle-Centaur (Centaur G and G-Prime)

Shuttle-Centaur was a proposed Space Shuttle upper stage.

After the Space Shuttle Challenger accident, and just months before the Shuttle-Centaur had been scheduled to fly, NASA concluded that it was too risky to fly the Centaur on the Shuttle. The probes were launched with the much less powerful solid-fueled IUS, with Galileo needing multiple gravitational assists from Venus and Earth to reach Jupiter.

Centaur (Titan IV)
The capability gap left by the termination of the Shuttle-Centaur program was filled by a new launch vehicle, the Titan IV. The 401A/B versions used a Centaur upper stage with a  diameter hydrogen tank. In the Titan 401A version, a Centaur-T was launched nine times between 1994 and 1998. The 1997 Cassini-Huygens Saturn probe was the first flight of the Titan 401B, with an additional six launches wrapping up in 2003 including one SRB failure.

Centaur II (Atlas II/III)

Centaur II was initially developed for use on the Atlas II series of rockets. Centaur II also flew on the initial Atlas IIIA launches.

Centaur III/Common Centaur (Atlas III/V)

Atlas IIIB introduced the Common Centaur, a longer and initially dual engine Centaur II.

Atlas V cryogenic fluid management experiments
Most Common Centaurs launched on Atlas V have hundreds to thousands of kilograms of propellants remaining on payload separation. In 2006 these propellants were identified as a possible experimental resource for testing in-space cryogenic fluid management techniques.

In October 2009, the Air Force and United Launch Alliance (ULA) performed an experimental demonstration on the modified Centaur upper stage of DMSP-18 launch to improve "understanding of propellant settling and slosh, pressure control, RL10 chilldown and RL10 two-phase shutdown operations.  DMSP-18 was a low mass payload, with approximately 28% of LH2/LOX propellant remaining after separation. Several on-orbit demonstrations were conducted over 2.4 hours, concluding with a deorbit burn. The initial demonstration was intended to prepare for more-advanced cryogenic fluid management experiments planned under the Centaur-based CRYOTE technology development program in 2012–2014, and will increase the TRL of the Advanced Cryogenic Evolved Stage Centaur successor.

Mishaps 
Although Centaur has a long and successful flight history, it has experienced a number of mishaps:
 April 7, 1966: Centaur did not restart after coast — ullage motors ran out of fuel.
 May 9, 1971; Centaur guidance failed, destroying itself and the Mariner 8 spacecraft bound for Mars orbit.
 April 18, 1991:  Centaur failed due to particles from the scouring pads used to clean the propellant ducts getting stuck in the turbopump, preventing start-up.
 August 22, 1992: Centaur failed to restart (icing problem).
 April 30, 1999: Launch of the USA-143 (Milstar DFS-3m) communications satellite failed when a Centaur database error resulted in uncontrolled roll rate and loss of attitude control, placing the satellite in a useless orbit.
 June 15, 2007: the engine in the Centaur upper stage of an Atlas V shut down early, leaving its payload — a pair of National Reconnaissance Office ocean surveillance satellites — in a lower than intended orbit. The failure was called "A major disappointment," though later statements claim the spacecraft will still be able to complete their mission. The cause was traced to a stuck-open valve that depleted some of the hydrogen fuel, resulting in the second burn terminating four seconds early.  The problem was fixed, and the next flight was nominal.
 August 30, 2018: Atlas V Centaur passivated second stage launched on September 17, 2014, broke up, creating space debris.
 March 23–25, 2018: Atlas V Centaur passivated second stage launched on September 8, 2009, broke up.
 April 6, 2019: Atlas V Centaur passivated second stage launched on October 17, 2018, broke up.

Centaur III specifications
Source: Atlas V551 specifications, as of 2015.

 Diameter: 3.05 m (10 ft)
 Length: 12.68 m (42 ft)
 Inert mass: 2,247 kg (4,954 lb)
 Fuel: Liquid hydrogen
 Oxidizer: Liquid oxygen
 Fuel and oxidizer mass: 20,830 kg (45,922 lb)
 Guidance: Inertial
 Thrust: 99.2 kN (22,300 lbf)
 Burn time: Variable; e.g., 842 seconds on Atlas V
 Engine: RL10-C-1
 Engine length: 2.32 m (7.6 ft)
 Engine diameter: 1.53 m (5 ft)
 Engine dry weight: 168 kg (370 lb)
 Engine start: Restartable
 Attitude control: 4 27-N thrusters, 8 40-N thrusters
 Propellant: Hydrazine

References 

Rocket engines using hydrogen propellant
Rocket stages
NASA space launch vehicles
United Launch Alliance